Cawl is a Welsh dish. In modern Welsh the word is used for any soup or broth; in English it refers to a traditional Welsh soup, usually called cawl Cymreig (literally 'Welsh soup') in Welsh. Historically, ingredients tended to vary, but the most common recipes are with lamb or beef with leeks, potatoes, swedes, carrots and other seasonal vegetables. Cawl is recognised as a national dish of Wales.

History
With recipes dating back to the fourteenth century, cawl is widely considered to be the national dish of Wales. Cawl was traditionally eaten during the winter months in the south-west of Wales. Today, the word is often used to refer to a dish containing lamb and leeks, due to their association with Welsh culture, but historically it was made with either salted bacon or beef, along with swedes, carrots and other seasonal vegetables. With the introduction of the potato into the Welsh cuisine in the later half of the 18th century, it became a core ingredient in the recipe as well.

The meat in the dish was normally cut into medium-sized pieces and simmered with the vegetables in water. The stock was thickened with either oatmeal or flour, and was then served, without the meat or vegetables, as a first course.  The vegetables and slices of the meat would then be served as a second course.  Cawl served as a single course is today the most popular way to serve the meal, which is similar to its north Wales equivalent lobsgows. Lobsgows differs in that the meat and vegetables were cut into smaller pieces and the stock was not thickened.

"Cawl cennin", or leek cawl, can be made without meat but using meat stock. In some areas cawl is often served with bread and cheese. These are served separately on a plate. The dish was traditionally cooked in an iron pot or cauldron over the fire and eaten with wooden spoons.

Etymology
The word cawl in Welsh is first recorded in the 14th century, and is thought to come from the Latin caulis, meaning the stalk of a plant, a cabbage stalk or a cabbage. An alternative suggestion is that it is from Latin calidus, sometimes already in Classical Latin shortened to caldus, meaning "warm", as this is the source of Spanish caldo, with the senses of broth or gravy.  The second suggestion seems more likely because of the sense, but in favour of the first theory, it is true that the one of the reflexes of Latin AU can be AW in Welsh, while the short A of calidus would normally give A.

See also

 Fårikål
 Irish stew
 Lancashire hotpot
 List of lamb dishes
 Scotch broth
 Scouse

Notes

Further reading

External links

BBC recipe for Cawl Cennin
recipe for cawl and other Welsh food

British soups
Lamb dishes
National dishes
Welsh cuisine
Stock (food)